Squads for the 1992 AFC Asian Cup played in Japan.

Group A

Iran

Manager: Ali Parvin

Japan

Head coach:  Hans Ooft

North Korea

Head coach: Hong Hyon-chol

United Arab Emirates

Head coach:  Valery Lobanovsky

Group B

China

Head coach:  Klaus Schlappner

Qatar

Head coach:  Sebastião Leopola

Saudi Arabia

Head coach:  Nelsinho

Thailand

Head coach:  Peter Stubbe

References 

AFC Asian Cup squads